Arènes de Fréjus or Amphithéâtre de Fréjus is a 12,000-capacity Roman amphitheatre located in Fréjus, France. The structure was built in the 1st century. In recent times the arena has been used for major rock concerts, hosting artists such as Rod Stewart, Queen, Iron Maiden, David Bowie and Tina Turner.

See also
 List of Roman amphitheatres

References

External links
 Official website

1st century in Roman Gaul
Buildings and structures in Var (department)
Roman amphitheatres in France
Roman sites in Provence